Volosko (Italian: Volosco, Volosca) is a part of the city of Opatija, located in the Kvarner Gulf in western Croatia. It is located in the north of Opatija, on the road towards Kastav and Rijeka. The toponym Volosko drives from the name of the Slavic deity Veles.

History 

Until 1918, the town (named VOLOSCA) was part of Cisleithania, the Austrian side of Austria-Hungary after 1867, head of the district of the same name, one of the 11 Bezirkshauptmannschaften in the Austrian Littoral province.

People
 Amelia Milka Sablich, born there
 Andrija Mohorovičić, born there
 Gyula Andrássy, died there
 Emil Sax, died there

Monuments and sights

Art installations "Lautus" and "1857" 
A permanent underwater site-specific art installation under the name "Lautus" (lat. cleaner) by artist Nika Laginja from Opatija can be found in the Voloscan bay 15 meters below sea level. It consists of mosses, shellfish, sponges and other organisms that act as sea cleaners and grow over the years. In addition to contributing to the restoration of underwater biodiversity, this stone installation also conveys a message of individual engagement and taking responsibility for the world in which we live.

As a response to Nika Laginja's underwater project, Czech artist Jiří Kovanda created the minimalist site-specific art installation "1857" which found its permanent home at the very beginning of the Lungomare promenade. Inspired by local nature and its history, Kovanda places his work near the birthplace of Andrija Mohorovičić, highlighting the distribution of the Adriatic Fucus, an endangered marine species today, back in 1857 when this prominent scientist was born.

Film location 
Several scenes of "The Legacy Run"  have been shot in Volosko. The movie, in good part shot in the Opatja-Rijeka region, is the conceptual prequel of the international Tv Series "Sport Crime".

Windsurfing

Volosko is situated on the west side of Preluka Bay, which is known for good windsurfing and sailing conditions. Daily thermal winds, locally known as Tramuntana, blow regularly from the north each morning, peaking just after sunrise and ending a few hours later.

Under prolonged high pressure systems, weather conditions may become stable, creating persistent winds strong enough to ensure adequate windsurfing (planing conditions) for hours each morning, making the Volosko and Preluk areas one of the most consistent windsurfing spots on the Adriatic coast.

Launch spots are at the beach near the Preluk auto camp and within the Volosko harbor itself. Each season, the local windsurfing club, DSNM Volosko, organizes one or more windsurfing races, open to both professional and amateur windsurfers.

See also
 Austrian Littoral

References

External links

Populated places in Primorje-Gorski Kotar County